The 1992–93 WHL season was the 27th season for the Western Hockey League.  Sixteen teams completed a 72-game season.  The Swift Current Broncos won the President's Cup.

League notes
The Red Deer Rebels joined the WHL as its 16th franchise, playing in the East division.

Regular season

Final standings

Scoring leaders
Note: GP = Games played; G = Goals; A = Assists; Pts = Points; PIM = Penalties in minutes

1993 WHL Playoffs

All-Star game

On January 19, a combined WHL/OHL all-star team defeated the QMJHL all-stars 7–5 at Montreal, Quebec before a crowd of 4,355.

WHL awards

All-Star Teams

See also
1993 Memorial Cup
1993 NHL Entry Draft
1992 in sports
1993 in sports

References
whl.ca
 2005–06 WHL Guide

Western Hockey League seasons
WHL
WHL